Liljeberg is a surname. Notable people with the surname include:

 Georg Liljeberg (1905–1993), German politician (SPD)
 Rebecka Liljeberg (born 1981), Swedish actress
 Yngve Liljeberg (1909–1978), Swedish ice hockey player